Cigaritis natalensis, the Natal bar or Natal barred blue, is a butterfly of the family Lycaenidae. It is found in South Africa, from the Eastern Cape along the coast to KwaZulu-Natal, Eswatini, the Free State, Mpumalanga, Gauteng, Limpopo and North West provinces, and part of the Northern Cape province. It is also present in Botswana.

The wingspan is 25-32.5 mm for males and 26.5–34 mm for females. Adults are on wing year-round with peaks from September to October and from March to May.

The larvae feed on Canthium inerme, Clerodendrum glabrum and Ximenia caffra.

References

External links
Die Gross-Schmetterlinge der Erde 13: Die Afrikanischen Tagfalter. Plate XIII 69 e

Butterflies described in 1851
Cigaritis